Horsfieldia sessilifolia is a species of plant in the family Myristicaceae. It is a tree endemic to Borneo, and has only been collected once for scientific purposes (1971) from Sarawak, a region known for agroforestry and cultivation of Sarawak black pepper. The habitat of H. sessilifolia is lowland areas of swampy forest.

References

sessilifolia
Endemic flora of Borneo
Trees of Borneo
Flora of Sarawak
Critically endangered flora of Asia
Plants described in 1985
Taxonomy articles created by Polbot